General der Artillerie (en: General of the artillery) may mean:

1. A rank of three-star general, comparable to modern armed forces OF-8 grade, in the Imperial German Army and its contingency armies of Prussia, Bavaria, Saxony and Württemberg. It also was used in the Reichswehr and the Wehrmacht. The second-highest regular rank below Generaloberst; cavalry officers of equivalent rank were called general of the cavalry, and infantry officers of equivalent rank general of the infantry.  The Wehrmacht also had General der Panzertruppen (tank troops), General der Gebirgstruppen (mountain troops), General der Pioniere (engineers), General der Nachrichtentruppen (communications troops) and several branch variants for the Luftwaffe. Today in the Bundeswehr, the rank of lieutenant general corresponds to the traditional rank of general of the artillery. There was no equivalent rank in the army of East Germany, where it was merged into that of Generaloberst.

2. in the Bundeswehr, the position of an artillery officer responsible for certain questions of troop training and equipment, usually with the rank of Brigadegenerals. The position of general of the artillery is connected with that of commander of the artillery school. Corresponding service positions also exist for other branches of the army. Since in this usage it refers to a position not a rank, an Oberst is sometimes "General of" his respective type of troops. The form of address is usually Herr General and/or Herr Oberst ; the form of address Herr General der Artillerie is unorthodox, since it does not refer to a rank.

List of officers who were General der Artillerie

A 
 Alexander Andrae (1888–1979)
 Maximilian de Angelis (1889–1974)

B 
 Paul Bader (1883–1971)
 Anton Reichard von Mauchenheim genannt Bechtolsheim (1896–1961)
 Karl Becker (1879–1940), Heereswaffenamt
 Hans Behlendorff (1889–1961)
 Wilhelm Berlin (1889–1987)
 Friedrich von Boetticher (1881–1967)
Hans von Bülow (1816-1897)

C 
 Eduard Crasemann (1891–1950)

E 
 Theodor Endres (1876–1956)
 Erwin Engelbrecht (1891–1964)

F 
 Wilhelm Fahrmbacher (1888–1970)
 Maximilian Felzmann (1894–1962)
 Maximilian Fretter-Pico (1892–1984)
 Werner von Fritsch (1880–1939); later Generaloberst

G 
 Curt Gallenkamp (1890–1958)
 Max von Gallwitz (1852–1937)
 Theodor Geib (1888–1944)
 Hans von Gronau (1850–1940)

H 
 Christian Hansen (1885–1972)
 Otto Hartmann (1884–1952)
 Walter Hartmann (1891–1977)
 Friedrich-Wilhelm Hauck (1897–1979)
 Ernst-Eberhard Hell (1887–1973)
 Kurt Herzog (1889–1948)
 Maximilian Ritter von Höhn (1859–1936)
 Prince Kraft of Hohenlohe-Ingelfingen (1827–1892)

J 
 Curt Jahn (1892–1966)
 Alfred Jodl (1890 – 1946); later Generaloberst

K 
 Rudolf Kaempfe (1893–1962)
 Leonhard Kaupisch (1878–1945)
 Walter Keiner (1890–1978)
 Konrad Krafft von Dellmensingen (1862–1953)
 Friedrich Freiherr Kress von Kressenstein (1870–1948)
 Georg von Küchler (1881–1968), later Generalfeldmarschall

L 
 Emil Leeb (1881–1969)
 Eduard von Lewinski (1829–1906)
 Fritz Lindemann (1890–1944)
 Christian Nicolaus von Linger (1669–1755), first officer to hold the rank of General of the Artillery in the Prussian Army
 Herbert Loch (1886–1976)
 Walter Lucht (1882–1949)

M 
 Erich Marcks (1891–1944)
 Robert Martinek (1889–1944)
 Horst von Mellenthin (1898–1977)
 Heinrich Meyer-Buerdorf (1888-1971)
 Willi Moser (1887–1946)
 Eugen Müller (1891–1951)

O 
  (1894–1959)

P 
 Walter Petzel (1883–1965)
 Max Pfeffer (1883–1955)
 Georg Pfeiffer (1890–1944)

R 
 Friedrich von Rabenau (1884–1945); killed in a concentration camp
 Antoni Wilhelm Radziwiłł (1833–1904)
 Walther von Reichenau (1884–1942); later Generalfeldmarschall
 Rudolf Freiherr von Roman (1893–1970)

S 
 Friedrich von Scholtz (1851–1927)
 Walther von Seydlitz-Kurzbach (1888–1976)
 Johann Sinnhuber (1887–1979)
 Hermann Ritter von Speck (1888–1940)
 Hans Speth (1897–1985)
 Hermann von Stein (1854–1927)
 Wilhelm Stemmermann (1888–1944)

T 
 Gerhard Tappen (1866–1953); by brevet
 Siegfried Paul Leonhard Thomaschki (1894–1967)
 Johann Nepomuk von Triva (1755–1827)

V 
  (1874–1945), Heereswaffenamt

W 
  (1893–1952)
 Eduard Wagner (1894–1944), Generalquartiermeister des Heeres, committed suicide
 Martin Wandel (1892–1943)
 Walter Warlimont (1894–1976)
 Helmut Weidling (1891–1955), later Kampfkommandant of Berlin
 Albert Wodrig (1883–1972)
 Rolf Wuthmann (1893–1977)

Z 
 Heinz Ziegler (1894–1972)

See also
General (Germany)
General of the branch
Military ranks of the German Empire
Military ranks of the Weimar Republic
Ranks and insignia of the German Army (1935–1945)

Three-star officers
Military ranks of Germany
Three-star officers of Nazi Germany
Lists of generals